Cryosophila cookii is a species of flowering plant in the family Arecaceae. It is found only in Costa Rica. It is threatened by habitat loss.

References

cookii
Flora of Costa Rica
Critically endangered plants
Taxonomy articles created by Polbot